Church of the Nativity of Christ may refer to:

 Church of the Nativity of Christ, Pirot
 Church of the Nativity of Christ and St. Nicholas (Florence)

See also 

 Church of the Nativity (disambiguation)
 Cathedral of the Nativity of Christ (disambiguation)
 Nativity of Christ (disambiguation)